Carotenuto is an Italian surname. Notable people with the surname include:

Bruno Carotenuto (born 1941), Italian actor
Mario Carotenuto (1915–1995), Italian actor
Memmo Carotenuto (1908–1980), Italian actor, father of Bruno and brother of Mario
Linda Tripp, née Carotenuto

Italian-language surnames